Starokhvalynsky (İśke Xvalın) is a rural locality (a khutor) in Novopetrovsky Selsoviet, Kugarchinsky District, Bashkortostan, Russia. The population was 12 as of 2010. There is 1 street.

Geography 
Starokhvalynsky is located 14 km southwest of Mrakovo (the district's administrative centre) by road. Musino is the nearest rural locality.

References 

Rural localities in Kugarchinsky District